A petition for stay is a legal action filed in an appeals court asking the court to stop (stay) the decision of a lower court.

See also 
 Stay of proceedings

References

Legal procedure